The Ehrlichsche Gestift was a charitable foundation set up in Dresden by the merchant and councillor Johann Georg Ehrlich in 1743.

Buildings and structures in Dresden
1743 establishments in the Holy Roman Empire